Forcellini is an Italian surname. Notable people with the surname include:

Christian Forcellini (born 1969), tennis player and sprinter from San Marino
Egidio Forcellini (1688–1768), Italian philologist
Silvana Forcellini (born 1943), Italian shot putter

Italian-language surnames